Never Better is a British television sitcom which started on BBC Two from 10 January to 14 February 2008. It stars Stephen Mangan as recovering alcoholic Keith Merchant and Kate Ashfield as his suffering wife Anita. The series is written by Fintan Ryan for World Productions.

The series has been described as a dark sitcom, being compared to other recent sitcoms such as Lead Balloon and Curb Your Enthusiasm. However, critics have complained that the show is too similar to these sort of programmes, as well as attacking the character of Keith for not being funny. The series was received poorly by viewers, with the first series attracting an average audience of less than one million viewers per episode.

Plot
Never Better is about Keith Merchant (Mangan), a recovering alcoholic in his mid-thirties whose life never seems to get better. His problems come from him being self-centred and preoccupied with his own flaws. He attends Alcoholics Anonymous meetings, but his behaviour often turns meetings into a farce, to the annoyance of group leader Doug (Christopher Fairbank). He has a family, with his wife Anita (Ashfield) and two children, Tom and Poppy. Whilst he attempts to be a good husband and father, his optimism for his family and attempts to do the right thing tend to lead to even more problems. Outside of AA, he has his friend Richard (Tom Goodman-Hill) for support, although Richard believes that Keith was a better friend when he was drinking.

Production
The series is written by Fintan Ryan, produced by Helen Gregory and directed by Martin Dennis. The series itself is made by production company World Productions. Mangan and Ashfield had previously worked together early in their careers, providing voices for an animated series of Watership Down. Ashfield claimed that on set, she "struggled to keep a straight face most of the time." She also said that her part made her more aware of her health. She said in an interview with The Times that she hoped the show would make, "people think twice about binge drinking." When asked if the role made her more abstemious, she said, "I watch what I drink and I try to keep myself healthy."

Mangan has said that he did not attend any AA meetings as part of research saying, "I didn't feel I could sit there and pretend to be an alcoholic, I thought that would be wrong. I also didn't want to stand up and say 'Hi, my name's Stephen, I'm an actor in a sitcom.' These are places where people are trying to work out really difficult stuff. We do touch on some controversial subjects in the series; there's a lad with Down syndrome in one episode. There's all sorts of topics that you wouldn't initially think are comic issues."

Reception
Never Better has been described as a dark sitcom. It has been compared to similar sitcoms such as Lead Balloon and Curb Your Enthusiasm. David Belcher in The Herald commented on the show positively writing about the lack of a laughter track and the show's making fun of controversial subjects such as Christianity.

However, people criticised Never Better for being too similar to other sitcoms and it received poor reviews overall. Paul Hoggart wrote in The Times that, "It is amiably amusing, but may suffer from comparison with last year's Outnumbered, which covered similar ground with superb dexterity." One critic from the Daily Mirror said, "Stephen Mangan's latest incarnation as recovering alcoholic Keith doesn't land with the same weight as Steve Coogan's Tommy Saxondale [from Saxondale] or Jack Dee's Rick Spleen [from Lead Balloon]."

A. A. Gill disliked the show, writing in The Sunday Times that, "Never Better (Thursday, BBC2) is so poor, so comically bereft, so rigorously scoured of charm, traction, humour or insight, that seeing that whichever sad sap wrote it couldn't be bothered to include an original syllable, neither can I. In America, the aspirational sitcom has, as is its nature, successfully progressed to become Friends and Sex and the City, Curb Your Enthusiasm, Frasier, The Larry Sanders Show. The recipe for success is simple: more of everything – more care, more commitment, more writers working harder to higher standards, with more discipline, for more money, with a collective understanding of what the genre stands for and, crucially, a belief that it has merit."

Gerard O'Donovan in the Daily Telegraph also attacked the programme. After the second episode had been broadcast, he wrote that, "Sadly, what modest potential the show evinced last week had evaporated in the interim. Recovering alcoholic Keith was again suffering from acute vagueness. Which was fine. But he also seemed to have lost his few remaining booze-free brain cells because he kept getting into scrapes as a result of not being able to use a mobile phone properly. If he'd been Victor Meldrew [from One Foot in the Grave], or a man of that generation, this might have been just about credible. But for an educated man in his thirties it was risible and came across as contrived beyond belief. A paper-thin character to begin with, with no job, no friends and no real personality to speak of, Keith was now entirely transparent, revealed as a mere vehicle for lazy situation comedy. Not even Mangan could rescue that."

The series attracted poor ratings. The third episode, broadcast on 24 January 2008, received 900,000 viewers, the lowest of the five main terrestrial channels that day. The following two episodes broadcast on 31 January and 7 February received 800,000 viewers (4% of the audience). The final episode had 823,000 viewers. This resulted in the series attracting an average audience of 935,000. In comparison, Little Miss Jocelyn, the programme that was broadcast immediately before Never Better over the same six weeks on BBC Two, attracted an average of 1.1 million viewers.

Episodes
The first series started on 10 January 2008 on BBC Two, as part of the channel's "Thursdays are Funny" line-up. The episodes are scheduled to be broadcast on Thursday nights at 22:00.

Adaptations
An American TV adaptation of Never Better was planned to be made for ABC. Damon Wayans was set to play the lead role, with Marc Buckland directing. The series is to be written by Dave Walpert, with Warren Littlefield, John Heyman and Don Reo acting as executive producers.

References

External links
 
Never Better at World Productions
Never Better on Radio Times

2008 British television series debuts
2008 British television series endings
2000s British sitcoms
BBC television sitcoms
BBC television comedy
English-language television shows
Television shows set in England